Donald or Don Kelly may refer to:

 Donald P. Kelly (1922–2010), Chicago businessman
 Don Kelly (footballer) (1922–2009), English footballer
 Don Kelly (baseball) (born 1980), American Major League Baseball player
 Don O'Kelly (1924–1966), also Don Kelly, American actor